The 1999–2000 season was Sport Lisboa e Benfica's 96th season in existence and the club's 66th consecutive season in the top flight of Portuguese football. It ran from 1 July 1999 to 30 June 2000. Benfica competed domestically in the Primeira Liga and the Taça de Portugal. The club also participated in the UEFA Cup, by virtue of finishing third in that tournament the previous season.

After sacking Scottish coach Graeme Souness, Benfica appointed UEFA Champions League-winning manager Jupp Heynckes. Limited by ongoing financial difficulties, the club signings consisted of players either on the books, free transfers or loans, such as with the Spaniards Chano and Tote, the former on a free deal, and the latter on loan. Tote arrived to replace Rushfeldt, who signed and practised with the team, before being recalled back by Rosenborg with disagreements over his transfer. Benfica started their campaign with a six-game winning streak in their first seven league games, topping the league until December; when a record-setting loss to Celta de Vigo, the greatest in its history, negatively affected the team mentality, causing them to drop to third place in Matchday 19, which would become their final position, finishing eight points behind Sporting, but securing a position in the upcoming season's UEFA Cup.

In total Benfica won 21 league matches, drew 6 and lost 7. Nuno Gomes was the season topscorer with 20 goals, of which 18 occurred in the Primeira Liga.

Summary

Pre-season
After a season which saw Graeme Souness sacked, the club looked for more experience and chose Jupp Heynckes on 30 May. During a 20-year career, the German manager had won titles for Bayern Munich and Real Madrid and was the first manager in 32 years to clinch a European title for Madrid the previous year.

The pre-season, which began in early July, included nine preparation matches in Portugal and abroad. From 18 to 31 July, the team played six matches against German teams. Their first game in Lisbon was against Bayern Munich on 10 August, and four days later they participated in the Trofeo Memorial Nereo Rocco against AC Milan.

Heynckes immediately requested signings in all three positions: defence, midfield and attack. Although the club scouted Hanuch (signed by Sporting) and Claudio Husaín for the midfield, the only players to join the team were Maniche and Marco Freitas (both on the club payroll and returning from one-year loans to Alverca). For attack Benfica considered Barcelona player Giovanni (who said, "It would be an honour for me to work with Heynckes") but ultimately signed Chano, a 34-year-old Spanish player from CD Tenerife.

The club was involved in a transfer saga over Norwegian striker Rushfeldt. He signed and practised with the team but left after Rosenborg claimed there were financial issues related to his transfer. He was replaced by Tote, on loan from Real Madrid, with the club president saying that "Tote was always the first choice" and Rushfeldt "did not have the personality or mental strength to play for Benfica".

Goalkeeper Michel Preud'homme retired at age 39. Arriving in 1994, he made nearly 200 appearances over five seasons and became a fan favourite. Benfica hired two replacements: Argentine Carlos Bossio and German Robert Enke. Heynckes described Bossio as the "more experienced" goalkeeper, with "a great talent", but also defining Enke as a "good, young goalkeeper; a promise". The Argentine had appearances on his national team and was the first choice at Estudiantes, while the German had its breakthrough at Borussia Mönchengladbach only a few months earlier. However, in a pre-season game against Bayern Munich Bossio conceded two goals: "I am calm, although we lost the game and my performance led to some 'scolding'." Enke confidently stepped into the position: "If I do not make mistakes, there will be no reason to change goalkeepers."

August and September
Benfica visited Vila do Conde for their opening Primeira Liga game on 22 August. Although Sérgio Nunes scored in the ninth minute, Hugo Henrique of the home team equalised it minutes later for a 1–1 draw. During the last week of August Benfica hosted Salgueiros, scoring one goal and missing a number of opportunities to increase their lead. Record entitled its article "If the Spaniard was a goalscorer it would have been a slaughter", referring to the wastefulness of Tote.

On 12 September Benfica visited Azores and beat Santa Clara 3–0 to move to top of the league table, tied with five other teams. Four days later the club started their European campaign, facing Dinamo Bucuresti at home. They lost 1–0, when a shot by Nastase slipped through Enke's legs. In the title race, Benfica led the table after defeating Vitória Setúbal. Newspaper Record portrayed the game as easy win for the club, writing, "Nothing better to raise morale than to win comfortably, without rush, without pushing, without any problem whatsoever."

Before their European game, the team travelled to Faro to defend their lead. They won their fourth consecutive match, with Nuno Gomes scoring his fourth goal in five games. At the end of September, Benfica travelled to Romania to play Dinamo Bucuresti. After a first-half goal by Maniche, Chano scored in the 71st minute to send Benfica into second round.

October and November
The club's momentum continued into October, when they defeated Estrela da Amadora with two second-half goals; Record summarized that the goals, "Finished the game off when it was most needed". On 16 October Benfica visited Barcelos, and increased their lead to four points over second-place FC Porto. In Europe, the club defeated P.A.O.K. in Greece, taking an advantage back to Portugal for the second leg.

In their eighth Primeira Liga match Benfica hosted Boavista F.C., settling for a draw after Whelliton scored in the 80th minute. It was the first time since late August that Benfica dropped points. For their last October game, they visited Alverca to face the local team, F.C. Alverca. Benfica lost their first league match; with a display that Record characterized as being under a Halloween spell; that resulted in "their worst performance of the season, and seeing Porto close in on the top of the table."

On 4 November, Benfica hosted P.A.O.K. for the second leg of their European qualifier. They lost 2–1 in normal time, requiring extra time and a penalty shootout to decide the match. The Lisbon side converted all their shots, progressing into the next round. Four days later, the club defeated S.C. Braga by one goal in a league match to open a three-point lead.

After a one-week break for the Taça de Portugal, Benfica visited Estádio das Antas for the Clássico against Porto. They lost 2–0 with goals from Capucho and Jardel, and the title-holders reduced Benfica's league lead to one point. In João Marcelino view, "The game between Porto and Benfica had to forcibly answer some questions — and it did not disappoint expectations. The easy win by Fernando Santos' team clearly showed who still is, almost six years later, the best team in domestic football; and the way that Jupp Heynckes accepted defeat could be used as evidence that he has been pushing his players to their current limit."

The following Thursday, Benfica visited Vigo for the third round of the UEFA Cup. Benfica made club history in the match; at half-time they were already losing 4–0, and three more goals in the second half broke the record for goals conceded, in their worst defeat ever. At their next training session hundreds of fans booed the team, and the club president compelled his players to apologize for their performance. Team captain João Pinto read a statement: "To Benfica, and to their supporters; aware of the abnormality of the result from the match in Vigo; the players, represented by the captain and vice-captain, publicly acknowledge that they didn't perform to club standards. We promise to redouble our commitment, towards dignifying this club. To them and to the millions of fans, we formally apologize." November's final game, a 2–0 victory over Campomaiorense, retained Benfica's league lead.

December and January
Benfica began December with a draw against Belenenses, with Porto's victory ensuring they surpassed Benfica in the league table. The team performance was at such a level that it allowed Record to claim, "The goalscoring chances could be counted on the fingers of a hand." In the second leg of the UEFA Cup against Celta de Vigo, the Spaniards and Heynckes fielded lineups almost entirely composed of reserves and the match ended in a one-all draw. On Matchday 14, Benfica beat U.D. Leiria by 3–2 with "two freak goals ensuring a win.", as Record put it. The final game of the year was a visit to Guimarães. Benfica scored first but allowed Vitória S.C. to come back, losing a third league match. They had not won outside Estádio da Luz since 16 October (when they led by four points), and began the New Year four points behind the leader in third place.

The year started with a Derby de Lisboa at home. After a scoreless tie, Sporting CP benefited from the points-share and Benfica fell to six points behind Porto. On 12 January the club hosted Amora for the Portuguese Cup, scoring seven goals against the third-tier team. Three days later, Benfica visited Funchal and nearly lost; Record labelled Enke's performance as crucial for Benfica, illustrating, "In the key moment of the game, when Enke defended a penalty in the 10th minute, he saved Benfica from leaving Funchal with a defeat. In a sluggish performance, only new signings Uribe and Machairidis showed good form."

On Matchday 18, Benfica hosted Rio Ave, winning their first league game in a month. Four days later, Benfica again played Sporting for the Portuguese Cup. Losing 3–1, the team were eliminated in their own stadium for the fourth time in club history; the first three were by Sporting in 1962–63, Braga in 1965–66 and Boavista in 1991–92. Benfica ended January with three points away from home for the first time since October, after defeating Salgueiros 2–1 in the Vidal Pinheiro.

February and March
Now focused on the league, Benfica continued their momentum and defeated Santa Clara at home. Chano was decisive in unlocking the game in the perspective of Record: "He was the vitamin that gave imagination and clarity to Benfica's midfield". They won a fourth consecutive time, beating Vitória de Setúbal in Estádio do Bonfim and gaining ground on Porto and Sporting (both of whom lost points). On 22 February, Benfica hosted Farense knowing that a win would put them one point behind the joint Primeira Liga leaders.

Benfica were surprised by the Faro side's opposition. José Manuel Delgado wrote in his match report for Record: "Heynckes' defence show[ed] inexplicable passivity, and Quinzinho was a loose threat that no one could stop. With an impressive performance, Farense made one, two and nearly three goals". Shortly after the 15-minute mark the Angolan striker was injured and Farense threats stopped, allowing Benfica to turn the match around: "After his substitution Benfica started to settle in the midfield, better supporting the attack ...until Maniche put the threats in practise and scored in the 23rd and 38th minutes, with Nuno Gomes leaving Benfica in the lead before halftime". For their last February match, Benfica visited Estádio José Gomes to face the local team, Estrela da Amadora. Two goals by Gáucho and another by Kenedy gave them their first league loss since 19 December, with Porto and Sporting regaining a four-point lead.

The Lisbon side rebounded with a home win against Gil Vicente F.C.; José Manuel Delgado called the victory "convincing, with moments of good football". The second game in March was at Estádio do Bessa. The match report in Record depicted Benfica's performance as good to begin with ("[Benfica] was better in the first half, scored first and stopped the Boavista press in the beginning of the second half"), until they conceded to Boavista before the final whistle: "[Benfica] receded, receded, until suffering a last-minute goal by Litos with Boavista reduced to ten men." On Matchday 26 Benfica hosted Alverca, defeating them with a late goal by João Tomás and avenging October's loss. The team ended March with a visit to Braga, undefeated by Benfica since 1995–96. Although the team led the game early, another late goal and the subsequent loss allowed both rivals to increase their lead.

April and May
On 1 April Benfica faced Porto in the second Clássico of the season, and a second-half goal by Sabry helped the club defeat their historic rivals. Gomes Ferreira commented: "The game was perfect for a nil-nil draw, when in the 67th minute a moment of genius decided the game: a great, meaningful goal from Saby, launching Benfica into the title race and hampering Porto". Benfica maintained their momentum on a trip to the Portalegre team, Campomaiorense. An early dismissal of José Soares helped them win easily, with Sabry scoring in a fourth consecutive game.

On 16 April Benfica hosted Lisbon rivals Belenenses, losing 3-2 and dampening any championship hopes. A week later the team lost their second straight match (their seventh defeat of the season) to União de Leiria 2–1, despite scoring first. On 30 April Benfica returned to top form, and in Miguel Costa Nunes opinion, defeated a "debilitated and riddled with internal conflicts" Vitória de Guimarães 3–0.

In the penultimate game of the season, Benfica faced Sporting for the third time; in their previous meetings, the club had tied once and lost once. Sporting, the league leader, was three points away from ending an 18-year drought dating to 1981–82. A late goal by Sabry dashed their hopes, preventing them from winning the title from Benfica. In the aftermath of the game, Record reported in their headline: "Till the end: A late goal from Sabry completely froze the thousands of Sporting fans waiting to celebrate the title", while O Jogo header read "Sabry causes short-circuit in Alvalade". Benfica ended the season with a third consecutive win, beating Madeira side Marítimo 2–1. However, in José Ribeiro's piece for Record, he wrote that Benfica "missed out on a thrashing that the fans and Marítimo deserved". The club finished four points from a Champions League berth and eight behind Sporting, who won their long-awaited title.

Competitions

Overall record

Primeira Liga

League table

Results by round

Matches

Taça de Portugal

UEFA Cup

First round

Second round

Third round

Friendlies

Player statistics
The squad for the season consisted of the players listed in the tables below, as well as staff member Heynckes (manager).

|}

Transfers

In

In by loan

Out

Out by loan

See also
 1999–2000 in Portuguese football

References
Specific

General
 

S.L. Benfica seasons
Benfica